Charles James Bacon Jr. (January 9, 1885 – November 15, 1968) was an American athlete and a member of the Irish American Athletic Club and the New York City Police Department. He won the 400 metres hurdles at the 1908 Summer Olympics.

He was born in Brooklyn, New York and died in Fort Lauderdale, Florida.

At the 1904 Summer Olympics he finished ninth in the 1500 metres event.

Two years later at the 1906 Summer Olympics he finished fifth in the 400 metres competition and sixth in the 800 metres event.

Just a month and a half before the 1908 Olympic Games in London, Bacon ran in Philadelphia setting a new unofficial world record of 55.8 in the 400 metre hurdles.

At the Olympic Games in 1908, he and fellow American Harry Hillman went over the last hurdle simultaneously, after which Bacon pulled away on the straight to win in a new world record of 55.0 seconds. This record was recognized by IAAF, thus Bacon became the first world record holder in the 400 metres hurdles. The same year, Bacon set the world record for the 440 yards, 10 hurdles, 3 feet 6 inches at Celtic Park, Queens, New York, the home of the Irish American Athletic Club on October 11, 1908.

Notes

References

External links
 
Irish America Archives - NYU
Winged Fist Organization

1885 births
1968 deaths
Sportspeople from Brooklyn
Track and field athletes from New York City
American male middle-distance runners
American male hurdlers
Athletes (track and field) at the 1904 Summer Olympics
Athletes (track and field) at the 1906 Intercalated Games
Athletes (track and field) at the 1908 Summer Olympics
World record setters in athletics (track and field)
New York City Police Department officers
Olympic gold medalists for the United States in track and field
Medalists at the 1908 Summer Olympics